Plymouth is a city in Sheboygan County, Wisconsin, along the Mullet River. It is included in the Sheboygan, Wisconsin Metropolitan Statistical Area. The city is located in the Town of Plymouth, but is politically independent. Plymouth is known as "Hub City" for its former role as a center of wooden wheelwrighting. The population was 8,932 at the 2020 census. Mayor Don Pohlman was last re-elected in April 2018.

History
Plymouth was surveyed in 1835 by United States engineers, one of whom was named Mullet, and the Mullet river was subsequently named after him.  The first land sold to a private party was sold to an Englishman named John Law who had emigrated from London. It was sold to Law on August 13, 1836. The next sale was to another Englishman, also from London, named Thomas Margrave. Settlers continued trickling in and the town was organized on April 3, 1849. In the 1840s a group of migrants arrived from Tioga County, Pennsylvania. Their ancestors had moved to that area from New England shortly after the American Revolution. The Thorpe family arrived from Hartford, Connecticut. They were of old New England ancestry. These migrants being the original pool of settlers in Plymouth gave the region cultural continuity with New England. The town was named Plymouth, after Plymouth, Massachusetts, where the Pilgrims had landed in 1620.

Originally known by early Native Americans as Quit Qui Oc, or Crooked River, Plymouth was settled in 1845 by Isaac Thorp and incorporated in 1877. The city is often called "Hub City" because of its central location within Sheboygan County, but the nickname "Hub City" began in the 1860s when the Schwartz brothers had a wagon shop where they made wagons, hubs and spokes.

Geography
Plymouth is located at  (43.749277, -87.976799).

Demographics

As of 2000 the median age in the city was 40.8 years. 24.2% of residents were under the age of 18; 6.3% were between the ages of 18 and 24; 24.9% were from 25 to 44; 27.3% were from 45 to 64; and 17.3% were 65 years of age or older. The gender makeup of the city was 47.6% male and 52.4% female.

2010 census
As of the census of 2010, there were 8,445 people, 3,710 households, and 2,253 families residing in the city. The racial makeup of the city was 96.2% White, 0.4% African American, 0.4% Native American, 0.7% Asian, 0.9% from other races, and 1.4% from two or more races. Hispanic or Latino of any race were 2.4% of the population.

There were 3,710 households, of which 29.1% had children under the age of 18 living with them, 48.4% were married couples living together, 9.2% had a female householder with no husband present, 3.2% had a male householder with no wife present, and 39.3% were non-families. 33.7% of all households were made up of individuals, and 15.2% had someone living alone who was 65 years of age or older. The average household size was 2.26 and the average family size was 2.91.

The median age in the city was 40.8 years. 24.2% of residents were under the age of 18; 6.3% were between the ages of 18 and 24; 24.9% were from 25 to 44; 27.3% were from 45 to 64; and 17.3% were 65 years of age or older. The gender makeup of the city was 47.6% male and 52.4% female.

Education
The Plymouth Joint School District serves the communities of Plymouth and nearby Cascade. It has three elementary schools, one middle school, and one high school. The Plymouth Joint School District is supported by the Plymouth Education Foundation, which provides scholarships, honors successful teachers, and raises funds for facility improvements.

Elementary schools 
There are three neighborhood elementary schools within the Plymouth Joint School District. Each elementary school offers summer youth athletic camps as well as extra-curricular opportunities throughout the school year.
 Parkview Elementary School 
 Fairview Elementary School 
 Horizon Elementary School

Middle school 
Riverview Middle School serves students in grades five through eight. It operates a "responsive education structure", which emphasizes differentiated instructional practice and balanced assessment for continuous review of student progress and collaboration, all guided by culturally responsive practices.

High school 
Plymouth High School has an enrollment of approximately 800 students and 53 full-time teachers.

Parochial schools 
St. John the Baptist Catholic School and St. John Lutheran School serve children in 3-K through eighth grade.

Economy 

Plymouth, Wisconsin has a long history in the cheese industry. Once the site of the National Cheese Exchange where cheese commodity prices were set, it now claims the mantle "Cheese Capital of the World" and is home to four major cheese processing facilities:
 Sargento
 Masters Gallery
 Sartori
 Great Lakes Cheese

Plymouth has a historic downtown district, which promotes a mix of retail, office and service uses. The main traffic artery through the city runs through downtown, resulting in a vibrant area lined with unique shops, eateries and boutiques. The downtown also offers a pedestrian network connecting neighborhoods, schools, parks and commercial areas.

Tourism
Tourism is an important industry for Plymouth, which hosts visitors to events all over Sheboygan County. With an abundance of parks, citywide events, easy access to the Kettle Moraine National Forest and ski hills, Plymouth is an attractive destination for tourists from all over the country. See recreational opportunities below.

Business parks
Plymouth is developing its third business park in partnership with the Plymouth Industrial Development Corporation. The new park, east of the city limits, will offer rail access, improved lots from 1 to 25 acres in size and loan and incentive programs through the county. It will join existing parks on the north and south sides of the city. With the Sheboygan County Economic Development Corporation, Plymouth actively works to recruit established businesses and startups to locate in the city.

Plymouth Chamber of Commerce 
With more than 300 member business in Sheboygan County, the Plymouth Chamber of Commerce's mission is to promote local businesses and attract new ventures to the community. The chamber works closely with the Sheboygan County Economic Development Corporation, especially in the promotion of the county's Someplace Better initiative to bring families into Sheboygan County, along with the Sheboygan County Chamber of Commerce.

Transportation 
Plymouth is located along State Highways 57, 67 and 23. Rail access is provided by the Wisconsin and Southern Railway Company (WSOR). Sheboygan County Memorial Airport (KSBM) is seven miles away. Plymouth is located less than an hour drive from Milwaukee and Green Bay.

Rail
A single-track railroad branch line between Plymouth and Sheboygan runs through the city. Built by the Chicago & North Western (C&NW) Railroad, the track originally paralleled the electric interurban Wisconsin Power & Light line, which terminated at Elkhart Lake. In later years it was primarily a freight line for the Chicago and North Western Transportation Company, and Union Pacific after Union Pacific acquired the C&NW in 1995. In 2006, citing low demand and degraded infrastructure, Union Pacific announced plans to abandon the line west of the Kohler Company factory in Kohler, thus terminating all service to Sheboygan Falls. In 2009, the Wisconsin Department of Transportation purchased the Plymouth-Sheboygan Falls portion of the line from Union Pacific, with the intent of repairing the long dormant line to allow the Wisconsin & Southern Railroad to provide restored service to Plymouth by 2015.

Airport
Plymouth is served by the Sheboygan County Memorial Airport (KSBM), which is located several miles east of the city. SKBM is the seventh-busiest airport in Wisconsin with no commercial travel. The 700+ daily flight operations are primarily business travel. SKBM is capable of landing a 98,000 lbs. aircraft or a Boeing 737 with the longest concrete runway 6,800 feet long, longer than a mile. The airport has fixed base operator with several private, industrial and commercial lots available for development.

Utilities 
Electrical, water and sewerage service is provided by the municipally-owned Plymouth Utilities, while natural gas service is from Wisconsin Public Service.

For communications, Frontier Communications provides landline telephone service along with broadband DSL services and maintains a central office downtown, while Spectrum is the city's cable provider.

Recreation 
Located east of the Kettle Moraine State Forest, Plymouth is a recreational destination. The city has 17 parks that offer recreational opportunities that include baseball (Plymouth Youth Athletic Association]), soccer (Plymouth Soccer Club), frisbee-golf, biking, swimming (Plymouth Aquatic Center), tennis, nature walks and more.

Biking and hiking 
Plymouth offers a self-guided walking tour of historic downtown, which includes more than 50 historically significant homes, businesses and buildings, two of which are listed on national Register of Historic Places.

Concerts
Free concerts are held every Thursday night during the summer at Plymouth City Park, located at Highway 67 and Grove Street. In addition, the Plymouth Arts Center hosts a variety of musical and theatre performances throughout the year.

County fair
The Sheboygan County Fair is held every year on Labor Day weekend at Sheboygan County Fair Park in Plymouth.

Festivals
Festivals in the Plymouth area include the Cheese Capital Jazz Crawl for the Arts, the Mill Street Festival, Road America races and a Holiday Gathering Christmas Parade.

Golf
Evergreen Golf Course is a 9-hole course located in Plymouth.

Racing
Plymouth Dirt Track Racing runs all summer at Sheboygan County Fair Park

Swimming

The Plymouth Aquatic Center at City Park is a zero-depth-entry pool with waterslides, a sand play area and concessions.

Plymouth High School's indoor pool is open to the community during open swim times.

Winter sports
Downhill skiing is available at Nutt Hill in Plymouth, which opens once there is 10 inches of snow on the ground.

Landmarks

Antoinette
She was erected in 1977, on the spot where the Wisconsin Cheese Exchange was located in the late 19th century, as part of the city's Centennial celebration. She's named after Jack Anton, who led the effort to put up the statue for the celebration.

Cheese Drop
The Sartori Cheese Drop is presented every year on New Year's Eve by the Plymouth Arts Center.

Walldogs
Painted on downtown buildings by a group of muralists called the Walldogs, there are 21 murals depicting scenes and businesses from Plymouth's history.

Notable people

Daniel P. Anderson, Presiding Judge of the Wisconsin Court of Appeals
Vera Eugenia Andrus, artist and printmaker
Theodore Benfey, Wisconsin State Senator
Bill B. Bruhy, Wisconsin State Representative and Mayor of Plymouth
Tony Evers, current Governor of Wisconsin and former Superintendent of Public Instruction
Emil R. Fischer, Green Bay Packers President 1948-1952  Cheese Business Executive
Val Heim, baseball player
Beau Hoopman, United States Olympic Rower
Frederick W. Krez, Wisconsin State Representative
Edwin J. Larson, Wisconsin State Representative
Walt Lautenbach, basketball player
Major C. Mead, Wisconsin State Senator
Bill Prietzel, racing driver
Otto Puhlman, Wisconsin State Representative
Patrick Henry Smith, Wisconsin State Senator
Tyler Vorpagel, Wisconsin State Representative
Allen F. Warden, Wisconsin State Representative

References

External links

 City of Plymouth
 Plymouth Chamber of Commerce
 Plymouth Arts Center
 Sanborn fire insurance maps: 1887 1903 1910

Cities in Sheboygan County, Wisconsin
Cities in Wisconsin
1849 establishments in Wisconsin